Basic writing, or developmental writing, is a subdiscipline of composition studies which focuses on the writing of students sometimes otherwise called "remedial" or "underprepared", usually freshman college students.

Definition
Sometimes called "remedial" or "developmental" writing, basic writing (BW) was developed in the 1970s in response to open admissions policies. BW can refer to both a type of composition course and a field of study. The term "basic writing" was coined by Mina Shaughnessy, a pioneer in the field, to distinguish it from previous terms like "bonehead" or "remedial". BW courses are designed to teach formal written standard English to students deemed un(der)prepared for first-year composition. Despite documented concerns about the ability of multiple-choice and impromptu timed-writing examinations to predict performance on authentic writing tasks, institutions of higher education typically enroll students in BW courses based on standardized or placement test scores, with standards varying by institution.

In the early work of Mina Shaugnessy, BW is traditionally characterized by texts that demonstrates a lack of understanding of the rules of formal written English, specifically within the context of academic discourse, which may manifest as nonstandard syntax, grammar, spelling, punctuation, usage, mechanics, organization, and clarity. However, BW has shifted its focus from error correction to other composition interests, including the writing process, rhetoric, development, and diversity. Nonetheless, the curriculum is inconsistently designed and implemented.

BW as a field of study tends to resist narrowly defining basic writers. Shaughnessy characterized basic writers as "those that had been left so far behind the others in their formal education that they appeared to have little chance of catching up, students whose difficulty with the written language seemed of a different order from those of the other groups, as if they had come, you might say, from a different country, or at least through different schools, where even modest standards of high-school literacy had not been met." Students who are first-generation, non-traditional, English language learners, racial minorities, or members of disadvantaged socioeconomic groups have been more likely to be placed into basic writing courses, in part because writing assessments have privileged students' abilities to write using standard academic written English.  In the mid 1980s, researchers Martinez and Martinez demonstrates that students characterized as basic writers are not basic thinkers.  Subsequent movements with writing studies have called for curriculum and instruction in basic writing courses that introduces students to the conventions and expectations of analytical and research writing tasks more like those in college credit writing courses.

Researchers in the field have advocated for the educational and socio-political status of students who are placed in basic writing courses. Deborah Mutnick asserts that basic writing "signifies struggles for inclusion, diversity and equal opportunity; debates over standards and linguistic hegemony",. Theorists like Jerome Bruner and Lev Vygotsky have shaped more modern understandings of basic writing as sites where students are introduced to complex tasks that challenge them to develop previously unfamiliar cognitive and rhetorical tasks.

Since the mid 2000s, scholars from both writing studies, education, and other fields have sought to complicate the knowledge and practices of basic writing, calling into question the distinction between "basic" and "college-ready" writing and writers. Reform efforts in the last decade have blurred what once was a bold distinction between the two groups.

History
Early versions of basic writing instruction in the United States started at Harvard between 1890 and 1910, when college enrollments nearly doubled. Modern basic writing originated in the 1970s when the City University of New York (CUNY) instituted an open admission policy for all New York City residents. In 1966, prior to open admissions, CUNY had instituted the SEEK program (Search for Education, Elevation, and Knowledge) which was designed as a pre-collegiate program that was meant to prepare students who were not yet ready to enter the university for full admission. As the open admissions policy caused college enrollments to nearly double at CUNY, Mina Shaughnessy headed the basic writing program to meet the demand for more writing instruction for under-prepared students. Since the late 1970s, many colleges and universities have created open admissions policies, and have in turn created BW programs across the country.

From its inception, basic writing has faced political and institutional opposition. Some saw open admissions as a way to overwhelm colleges with the "wrong kind of students", and others, including the famous editorial "Why Johnny Can't Write", criticized what they saw as the lowering standard of writing instruction. In 1976 CUNY cut the budget for the basic writing program and started charging tuition for open admissions students, measures that had dramatic negative effects on both students and educators in the basic writing program. Similar efforts to reduce or eliminate BW courses were revived in the 1990s and have continued to the present day.

Major Theorists

Mina P. Shaughnessy
Mina P. Shaughnessy (pronounced MY-NA SHAWN-ES-EE), involved with the SEEK program at CUNY, was a proponent of open admissions for City College (part of the CUNY system) and became director of the BW program once City College opened its doors to all. Shaughnessy worked hard not only to design a curriculum for students that seemed alien to the professors that literally did not know what to do with students who seemed not to be able to put two words together, in some cases, but to understand and categorize the characteristics of basic writers in order to understand them better, and be able to teach them more effectively. For this purpose, Shaughnessy compiled four-thousand placement essays written by students as part of the entrance process into City College and classified the errors that she found, trying to understand the logic behind spelling, syntax, grammar, etc., that seemed, at best, scattered and, at worst, completely arbitrary. She published her results in the book Errors and Expectations (1977). Her main conclusion is that these writers are not scattered or arbitrary, but that they have created systems of written English based on misunderstood rules, half-understood lessons on punctuation, their own local or familial dialects, among others, and have logically created their own systems of written English. It is not that these students do not understand communication, but they simply have not been taught or have misunderstood the rules of written formal English. Shaughnessy's work was considered groundbreaking and Errors and Expectations is still considered the seminal book in the field of BW. And although she died in 1978, and other scholars have made contributions to the field, Shaughnessy remains its leading figure today.

Shaughnessy is arguably the most prominent name in the field of BW. She helped create the atmosphere of academic respectability BW needed to become recognized as a legitimate scholarly field. Her 1977 book, Errors and Expectations, set the tone for much (if not all) of the BW scholarship that followed. BW scholars, whether they agree with Shaughnessy or not, are still responding to her. She resolutely held that such students could be taught how to effectively write. It is teachers of BW and not BW students that need to radically alter their views toward the teaching and learning of writing. In her 1976 speech, "Diving In: An Introduction to Basic Writing", she asserted that "teachers (need to) realize and accept the need to remediate themselves regarding the needs and learning styles of basic writers."

Shaughnessy's Legacy
Later scholars critiqued some aspects of Shaugnessy's work. Min Zhan Lu, for example, problematized Shaugnessy's essentialist view of language, expectation that basic writers adjust to mainstream linguistic standards, and failed to acknowledge politica, economic, and institutional contexts that shape the designation of basic writers and basic writing. Lu's critique applied to other big names in the field of BW including Mike Rose (see below).

Other notable scholars of BW, however, like Laura Gray-Rosendale have claimed that such critiques of Shaughnessy do not hold much critical weight. "Shaughnessy's works", themselves, she claims, "render ambiguous if not outright defy many such negative characterizations." Also, David Bartholomae (see below) has defended Shaughnessy's emphasis on error in BW students' writing (though he still advocates refocusing BW to help students learn various academic dialects). Adjusting the focus a bit, "Bartholomae extends Mina Shaughnessy's hope that teachers, especially basic writing teachers, will examine how they view errors in student writing. For example, he suggests that teachers who cannot understand student prose do not read the prose as complex texts and thus do not find the logic at work in many errors."

David Bartholomae

David Bartholomae is professor of English and chair of the English Department at the University of Pittsburgh. Bartholomae's most-referenced publication about BW is the book chapter "Inventing the University", in which he unpacks the audience and purpose of writing for the academy, particularly from the perspective of students new to this discourse community. Bartholomae writes: "Every time a student sits down to write for us, he has to invent the university for the occasion--invent the university, that is, or a branch of it, like history or anthropology or economics or English. The student has to learn to speak our language, to speak as we do, to try on the peculiar ways of knowing, selecting, evaluating, reporting, concluding, and arguing that define the discourse of our community."

Bartholomae asserts that (though important) error should not determine the efforts of or relationship between BW teachers and their students. Rather, BW teachers should recognize that the language they demand from their BW students (typically short, direct, non-abstruse sentences) is not the language that they (the teachers) typically write and publish in. Students experience such disconnect between what they learn from their writing classes and what their discipline specific course require of them that they are often left to their own devices to figure out how to write acceptably in any given discipline. To resolve this, Bartholomae believes that BW teachers should immerse their students with academic writing (peer-reviewed journal articles, book chapters, etc.). BW students thus get a healthy exposure to sufficient sums of "academic" language in a teacher-assisted environment. This, Bartholomae claims, should help BW students make the transition more quickly to start writing "academically". The idea that academics might personally strive to exhibit a clear, cogent, and elegant style in their articles and chapters, and thus model good writing for their students to emulate, is not entertained.

Mike Rose

Mike Rose was professor of social research methodology at UCLA, best known in the BW community for his part autobiographical/part pedagogically philosophical book, Lives on the Boundary. Rose's main interests in the study of thinking and learning included the "study of the factors – cognitive, linguistic, socio-historical, and cultural – that enhance or limit people's engagement with written language." As well as, "The development of pedagogies and materials to enhance critical reading and writing, particularly at the secondary and post-secondary level, and particularly with 'underprepared' or 'at risk' populations."

Additionally, Rose has argued for the term basic writing as opposed to the terms "developmental" or "remedial" which have the connotations of medical terminology.

Kelly Ritter 
Kelly Ritter is professor and associate dean of curricula and academic policy and professor of English and writing studies in the College of Liberal Arts and Sciences and is best known for her historical work on basic writing in college. In her landmark book, Before Shaughnessy: Basic Writing at Yale and Harvard, 1920-1960, Ritter asks readers to reconceptualize the sorting phenomenon that frames basic writing as a course, phenomenon or identity that emerges with the notable work of Mina Shaughnessey actually reflects a much longer history of "social sorting" that has existed not just in open-access institutions but in the most selective of colleges. By examining the history of Yale students who were assigned to take courses—colloquially called the "Awkward Squad", Ritter aims to help scholars develop a "better, more historically informed schemata for first-year writing programs, one that is cognizant of the role that local values play in shaping definition."

Reform Efforts 
Reform efforts nationally have taken the form of many different interventions, some of them originating from faculty working in open-access institutions, and others imposed from legislative mandates at the state level. These efforts focus on reducing the amount of pre-college or remedial coursework that students are required to complete prior to taking degree-credit courses, responding to research suggesting that students who take remedial coursework are less likely to be retained to college. Some of the efforts include the following:

 Accelerated Learning Program: Faculty at the Community College of Baltimore County developed a program that moved students assessed as needing remedial coursework into a college-credit writing course with additional support in the form of class time and more intensive small group instruction.
 AB 705 (California): AB 705 is a bill signed by the governor of California that took effect in 2018. The California Community Colleges Office of Assessment and Placement notes that "AB 705 was written to clarify existing regulation and ensure that students are not placed into remedial courses that may delay or deter their educational progress unless evidence suggests they are highly unlikely to succeed in the college-level course". Community college teachers and administrators have sought to adjust their curriculum and placement mechanisms to respond to the legislation.
Stretch Courses: "Stretched" writing courses, typically, offer students the opportunity to take a two-semester version of a one-semester writing course, instead of requiring them to complete a noncredit course before taking a "mainstream" one-semester version. The stretching of the curriculum allows students the opportunity of additional drafting, reading, discussion, workshopping, and student-teacher interaction and typically allows both semesters to count toward graduation credit.
Writing Studio: A writing studio model is an approach to supporting students' transition to college writing by including a component of instruction that takes place in what Grego and Thompson call a "third space" outside of the traditional classroom. Features of writing studio include facilitated small group interaction and "interactive, mentored feedback."

See also
Composition studies
Cooling out
First-year composition
Literacy
Theories of rhetoric and composition pedagogy

References

Further reading
 Bartholomae, David. "The Tidy House: Basic Writing in the American Curriculum". Journal of Basic Writing, vol. 12, no. 1, 1993, pp. 4–21.
 Council on Basic Writing Blog
 Duttagupta, Chitralekha, and Robert J. Miller, editors. The Bedford Bibliography for Teachers of Basic Writing. 4th ed., Bedford, 2015.
 Enos, Theresa, editor. A Sourcebook for Basic Writing Teachers. Random House, 1987.
 Journal of Basic Writing.
 Otte, George, and Rebecca Williams Mlynarczyk. Basic Writing. Parlor Press, 2010. 
 Shaughnessy, Mina. Errors and Expectations: A Guide for the Teacher of Basic Writing. Oxford University Press, 1979.

Writing